Metal Slug Advance is a run and gun video game for the Game Boy Advance handheld system created by SNK Playmore in 2004, and is canon to the Metal Slug series.

Storyline
A survival training camp for new Peregrine Falcon recruits has just begun, where the recruits must survive on an unnamed island with limited supplies and weaponry. However, a large blimp  begins to hover above the island, as General Morden's troops parachute down and attempt to build a new base, while successfully capturing many of the new recruits. Players play as either new recruits Walter Ryan or Tyra Elson as the survival training soon becomes a full-fledged assignment for the remaining recruits as they pierce through enemy lines.

Gameplay
The gameplay is very similar to any other Metal Slug game, but with two new systems; the life system, and the card system. The life system is simply a life bar for players, as it replaces the extra lives from all the other Metal Slug games. As players take damage, the life bar depletes (different attacks cause different amounts of damage). Collecting food items can restore health, and players instantly die from being crushed, or falling down a pit.

The Card system is a card collecting part of the game. Cards can be found from shooting certain parts of the background, and by obtaining it from certain hostages, and sometimes by doing both. The cards have many different purposes, from giving detailed info on items and characters from the Metal Slug series to boosting player abilities, and even unlocking special (and new) slugs. There are 100 cards to collect, and collecting them all becomes the main objective to anyone who defeats the final boss.

Reception 

Metal Slug Advance received "generally favorable" reviews according to review aggregator Metacritic.

References

External links

2004 video games
Game Boy Advance games
Game Boy Advance-only games
Metal Slug
Run and gun games
SNK Playmore games
Video games developed in Japan
Video games featuring female protagonists
Single-player video games